Nuri al-Mismari (born 1942) is the former Chief of Protocol of Libyan dictator Muammar Gaddafi and one of his closest aides. He was a key member of Gaddafi's inner circle and served under him for 40 years.

Biography 
Nuri Al Mismari was born in 1942 in Tripoli , Libya he comes from a prominent family as his father was a minister in the Kingdom of Libya under Idris of Libya. He is from the Masamir tribe . He was considered the "gatekeeper" of Gaddafi and one of a small group of officials with access to Gaddafi's tent. Distinguished by his dyed blonde hair and goatee and ceremonial uniform, he was often seen standing next to Gaddafi at public events and shepherding visitors to Gaddafi. A hotelier by trade, he was in charge of coordinating visits by foreign heads of state to Libya (including lodging at palaces), overseeing Libya's payments to Gaddafi's children, and managing Gaddafi's fleet of airplanes. He was considered a pro-free market reformer aligned with Gaddafi's son Saif al-Islam within the Libyan ruling elite. He speaks fluent English and French. One of his sons was shot under mysterious circumstances in 2007 and the death was ruled a suicide. In 2008, Mismari played a minor role in reuniting a British woman with her daughter after her ex-husband abducted their daughter and took her to Libya.

On October 21, 2010, Mismari fled to France after stopping by Tunisia. He was last seen with Gaddafi at the Arab-African summit in Sirte on October 9 and 10th, 2010. It was alleged Gaddafi had insulted and slapped Mismari at the summit. His defection was not publicized until November 28, 2010, when Libya issued an international arrest warrant against him. He was arrested in Paris at the request of Libya, which alleged he was involved in embezzlement. Mismari was subsequently the subject of an international incident between Libya and France when it was alleged that he had defected to France. His supporters in Libya, including sources close to Gaddafi's reformist son Saif al-Islam, countered that Mismari only went to France to undergo heart surgery and was set up amid a power struggle within Gaddafi's inner circle. According to Francois Bechis of the Italian newspaper Libero, Mismari gave extensive information while under French custody, claimed that he had connections within Tunisian dissidents, pinpointed the weaknesses of the Gaddafi regime, and was formally seeking asylum in France. Foreign Minister Moussa Koussa was held responsible for Mismari's defection and, anticipating more potential defections, Gaddafi confiscated the passports of several senior officials, including Koussa.

On December 15, 2010, Mismari was released from French custody to the Hôtel Concorde Lafayette and his extradition hearing was subsequently postponed as the French judge requested more information from Libya. On December 16, 2010, Gaddafi sent Abdallah Mansour, the head of Libyan state media, to lure Mismari back to Libya. Instead, Mansour was arrested at the Hotel Concorde Lafayette. On December 23, 2020, a delegation of anti-Gaddafi Libyans (Farj Charrani, Fathi Boukhris, and Ali Ounes Mansouri) arrived in Paris to dine with Mismari, yet sources close to Mismari claimed he had resumed his "normal functions" as Head of Protocol and was preparing to return to Libya.

Due to the Libyan Civil War breaking out in February 2011, Mismari was never extradited to Libya. In February 2011, one of Gaddafi's sons, Mutassim, allegedly came to Paris to ask him to return to Libya to no avail and Mismari subsequently tendered his resignation as Chief of Protocol from exile. As of 2013, he was still living in Paris.

In February 2011, his son, Ihab El-Mismari, a high-ranking diplomat representing the Libyan embassy in Canada, resigned in protest over Gaddafi's crackdown of protestors in the early phase of the Libyan Civil War. Ihab was not among the five Libyan diplomats expelled from Canada in May 2011.

In March 2011, Mismari predicted that Gaddafi would fight to the end in the Libyan Civil War rather than step down, commit suicide, or go into exile. He also alleged that Silvio Berlusconi, Prime Minister of Italy, had sent escorts to an unidentified African leader to help Gaddafi get elected as Chairperson of the African Union in 2009.

On April 30, 2011, Gaddafi's son Saif al-Arab and three grandchildren were killed by a French airstrike and it was alleged that Mismari had given away the locations of Gaddafi's secret safe houses to the French.

In a 2012 interview with Al-Hayat, Mismari alleged that Gaddafi's mother was Jewish and that Gaddafi killed anybody who found out about it, notably Libyan ambassador to Italy, Ammar Dhu, and military officer, Salih Bu Farwa. Mismari also claimed that on two occasions, Gaddafi raped foreign visitors to Libya. The alleged victims were a Nigerian woman and the wife of a Swiss businessman. He also alleged that Gaddafi sexually harassed the ex-wife of French President Nicolas Sarkozy, Cecilia.

In a 2013 interview with French journalist Annick Cojean, Gaddafi's Chief of Security Mansour Dhao accused Mismari and Mabrouka Sherif of being the primary facilitators of Gaddafi's alleged sexual abuse. Dhao also accused Mismari of procuring prostitutes for Gaddafi and practicing black magic. Mismari was named in Cojean's book Gaddafi's Harem: The Story of a Young Woman and the Abuses of Power in Libya.

In 2014, Mismari was interviewed by BBC for the documentary “Mad Dog – Qaddafi’s Secret World," where he alleged that Gaddafi was "terribly sexually deviant," kept underaged male and female sex slaves, and kept the body of Mansour Rashid El-Kikhia, former Libyan Minister of Foreign Affairs, in a freezer.

References

Libyan politicians
Living people
People of the First Libyan Civil War
1942 births